Rik Sebens (born 21 May 1988) is a Dutch former professional footballer who played for De Graafschap and Achilles '29.

Career
Sebens began his career with De Graafschap, and extended his contract with the club in June 2010. He scored 1 goal in 18 league games for the club. He later played with Achilles '29.

References

1988 births
Living people
Footballers from Leiden
Dutch footballers
De Graafschap players
Achilles '29 players
Eredivisie players
Eerste Divisie players
Association football midfielders